Agel is a French commune.

Agel may also refer to:
Mont Agel, mountain on the France-Monaco border
Jesse Agel (born 1961), American basketball coach